The West Bend School District (officially West Bend Joint School District #1) is a school district in Wisconsin serving the city of West Bend, the villages of Jackson and Newburg, and parts of the towns of Polk, Trenton, Barton, West Bend, Jackson, and Addison.

As of the 2019-2020 school year, the district served more than 6,000 students.

High schools
The district has two high schools, East and West, which share one building. Each school has about 1,100 students. The two high schools were formed in 1970, but proposals for merging the schools have been raised since the 1980s.  Incoming freshmen born on even-numbered dates attend West Bend East while those born on odd-numbered dates attend West Bend West. Students with siblings already in high school follow their eldest sibling, so all children from a family attend the same high school. The high schools have different students, teachers, and sports teams, but share an auditorium, music department, gymnasium complex, and natatorium. In athletics, both East and West participate in the North Shore Conference.
 
Every two years, in partnership with the West Bend police and fire departments, the high schools hold the two-day Every 15 Minutes program for juniors and seniors, which challenges them to think about drinking, driving, personal safety, and the responsibility of making mature decisions. In partnership with the city's police and fire departments, a mock DUI crash is held on East Decorah Road.
 
West Bend East

West Bend East's athletic teams are known as the Suns. The school's colors are maroon and gold. In 2013 East was listed #1249 among Newsweeks top U.S. high schools.West Bend West'''

West Bend West's athletic teams are known as the Spartans. The school's colors are blue and white. In 2013 West was listed #1090 among Newsweek'''s top U.S. high schools.

Schools

High schools
 West Bend East High School
 West Bend West High School

Intermediate school
 Silverbrook Intermediate School - grades 5-6

Middle school
 Badger Middle School - grades 7-8

Elementary schools
 Decorah Elementary School
 Fair Park Elementary School
 Green Tree Elementary School
 Jackson Elementary School
 McLane Elementary School

Other
 4K Program using Community-Based Providers
 Head Start for Washington County 
 Rolfs Education Center (3- and 4-year-old Head Start)

Notable alumni

Louis A. Arnold, HVAC worker and Socialist Wisconsin state senator
Bob Gannon, businessman and Wisconsin state Representative
Otto Kehrein, carpenter and Socialist Wisconsin state Representative
Willie Mueller, pitcher for the Milwaukee Brewers and actor in the movie Major League
Ryan Rohlinger, the third baseman for the San Francisco Giants.
Henry O. Schowalter, lawyer and Democratic Wisconsin state Representative
Dave Steckel, hockey player for the New Jersey Devils
Viola S. Wendt, poet and educator

References

External links
West Bend School District

School districts in Wisconsin
Education in Washington County, Wisconsin